San Agustín Atenango  is a town and municipality in Oaxaca in south-western Mexico. The municipality covers an area of 82.93 km2. It is part of the Silacayoapam District in the Mixteca Region.

Population Demographics 
As of 2020, the municipality had a total population of 1,871. Out of the town's population, 963 are female (51.5%), and 908 are male (48.5%). The primary indigenous language spoken in San Agustín Atenango is Mixteco, with 892 people (47.9%) speaking the language. 934 people in the town (49.9%) live in moderate poverty, while 404 people (21.6%) live in extreme poverty. In the town, 1,586 people are indigenous, and 21 people are Afro-Mexican.

References

 "San Agustín Atenango: Economy, employment, equity, quality of life, education, health and public safety". Data México. Retrieved 2022-06-18.
 "Informe anual sobre la situación de pobreza y rezago social 2022" (PDF). 2022. Retrieved 18 June 2022.

Municipalities of Oaxaca